Short Critical Study of the Novus Ordo Missae (Italian: Breve Esame Critico del Novus Ordo Missae), nicknamed Ottaviani Intervention, is a 1969 document written by some Roman Catholic theologians addressed to Pope Paul VI to criticise what those theologians perceived as problems in the Mass of Paul VI — also called "Novus Ordo Missae" —, Mass which had been promulgated earlier the same year. The surname of the document comes from one of its writers, Alfredo Ottaviani.

History 
Cardinals Alfredo Ottaviani and Antonio Bacci sent the Short Critical Study to Pope Paul VI with a cover letter dated 25 September 1969.  The study cast doubt on the orthodoxy of the Mass of Paul VI, which had been promulgated by the apostolic constitution Missale Romanum of 3 April 1969, though the definitive text, which took account of some of the criticisms of the Short Critical Study, had not yet appeared.

Michel-Louis Guérard des Lauriers is said to be the main intellectual force behind the study.

Pope Paul VI asked the Congregation for the Doctrine of the Faith, the department of the Roman Curia that Ottaviani had earlier headed, to examine the Short Critical Study. It responded on 12 November 1969 that the document contained many affirmations that were "superficial, exaggerated, inexact, emotional and false".

It stated:

The letter also expressed regret on the part of the cardinal that his letter of 25 September 1969 had been published:

Jean Madiran, a traditionalist Catholic who was the founder-director of the review Itinéraires, which was condemned by the French episcopate in 1966, maintained that Itinéraires had received the cardinal's authorization to publish his letter to the Pope and suggested that Ottaviani had signed the letter to Dom Gerard-Marie Lafond, prepared by Ottaviani's secretary, without knowing its contents, since Ottaviani was blind.

Notes

References

External links 

 Text of the document in English (also on EWTN)
1969 documents
Catholic liturgy